Henry Gaylon Matthew Webb (born May 21, 1950) is a former pitcher in Major League Baseball who played from 1972 to 1977 for the New York Mets and Los Angeles Dodgers.

Webb was the losing pitcher in the longest game played to a decision in National League history. On September 11, 1974, Webb pitched the 25th inning of the Mets' loss to the St. Louis Cardinals. Webb was charged with the only error of his major league career when his wild pickoff throw allowed Bake McBride to score all the way from first base to give St. Louis the victory. It was the first decision of Webb's major league career.

Webb pitched a seven inning, 1–0 no hit victory for the Tidewater Tides of the International League on June 7, 1974.

He is the father of three sons, Kevin, Kyle and former Major League pitcher Ryan Webb.

References

External links

1950 births
Living people
Major League Baseball pitchers
Los Angeles Dodgers players
New York Mets players
Miami Amigos players
Marion Mets players
Pompano Beach Mets players
Memphis Blues players
Visalia Mets players
Tidewater Tides players
Albuquerque Dukes players
Baseball players from New York (state)
People from Copiague, New York